Polideportivo Municipal Carlos Cerutti is an indoor arena in Córdoba, Argentina.  It is primarily used for basketball and is the home arena of the Asociación Deportiva Atenas.  It holds 3,500 people.

External links
Official Facebook

Indoor arenas in Argentina
Basketball venues in Argentina